Holgado is a surname. Notable people with the surname include:

 Fermín Holgado (born 1994), Argentine footballer
 John Holgado (born 1992), American musician
 Juan Holgado (born 1968), Spanish archer
 Rodrigo Holgado (born 1995), Argentine footballer
 Ticky Holgado (1944–2004), French actor